Lad Lake is a residential care center with programs for troubled and neglected youth in Dousman, Wisconsin, United States. Established in 1902 in Dousman, thirty miles west of Milwaukee, on 367 acres of land, it was originally known as the Wisconsin Home and Farm School.

References

Additional sources

External links
 Official website

Schools in Waukesha County, Wisconsin
Boarding schools in Wisconsin
Private schools in Wisconsin